The 1980 season was the eleventh season of national competitive association football in Australia and 97th overall.

National teams

Australia national soccer team

Results and fixtures

Friendlies

1980 Oceania Cup

Men's football

National Soccer League

Cup competitions

NSL Cup

Final

First leg

Second leg

References

External links
 Football Australia official website

1980 in Australian soccer
Seasons in Australian soccer